Cyperus platycaulis is a species of sedge that is native to parts of Africa.

See also 
 List of Cyperus species

References 

platycaulis
Plants described in 1887
Flora of Madagascar
Flora of Tanzania
Flora of Angola
Flora of Botswana
Flora of Burundi
Flora of South Africa
Flora of Uganda
Flora of the Republic of the Congo
Flora of the Democratic Republic of the Congo
Flora of Malawi
Flora of Rwanda
Flora of Sudan
Flora of Zambia
Flora of Zimbabwe
Taxa named by John Gilbert Baker